Union-Endicott High School (UEHS) is a public high school located in Endicott, New York. The school, a part of the Union-Endicott Central School District, enrolls 1,280 students from 9-12 and has a student/teacher ratio of 12.8:1. Union-Endicott was listed as the 4,190th best public high school in the United States in 2021 by U.S. News & World Report on their annual list of Best High Schools in America. In the 201314 school year the school had an operating budget of $74,018,097. The only feeder school is Jennie F. Snapp Middle School also located in Endicott.

History 
Union-Endicott High School opened in 1915. During the summer of 2014, work was done to remove asbestos from the building. The initiative was part of a 7 mil capital project that voters approved in a December 2013 referendum.

The firm of Cummings and Conrad were selected to design and build a three-story, brick school at a cost of just over $100,000. Work on the structure continued through early 1915. The builders had to contend with the farm at the rear of the property that is now Ty Cobb Stadium. They also had to put up with visitors to the adjoining Casino Park.

Ithaca architect Fred Thomas designed a new four-story addition to the school that merged elements of the original building. The new addition added 135,000 feet of space at a cost of $6.2 million. The modular design could change as needs shifted in the future. Work began in 1972, and the project was complete by 1974. The modern addition included laboratories, art and music rooms and health classrooms.

Demographics

In the 201415 school year, the Union-Endicott student body was 53% male, 47% female, 79% White, 7% Black, 7% Hispanic, 3% Asian, 0.1% American Indian/Alaskan Native, and 5% Multiracial. There was a total enrollment of 1,165 students.

Notable alumni
 Ed Zandy (class of ) – musician with Glenn Miller Band
 Ken Zubay (class of 1942) - IBM executive and Minnesota state representative
 Johnny Logan (class of 1945) - MLB player, 4-time All-Star
 Johnny Hart (class of ) – cartoonist, creator of B.C., co-creator of The Wizard of Id
 Jack Caprio (class of 1949) - writer, B.C. and The Wizard of Id.
Gary Wilson (class of 1971) - musician 
 Sarah Patterson (class of 1974) - Alabama Crimson Tide gymnastics head coach 1979-2014
 John Marshall - cartoonist, head artist of Blondie
 Isaiah Kacyvenski (class of 1996)  NFL linebacker and investor
 Eric Appel (class of ) – television director
 Jim Johnson (class of ) – MLB pitcher, 2-time saves leader
 Arthur Jones (class of 2004) – NFL player
 Jon Jones (class of 2005) – professional mixed martial artist, UFC Heavyweight Champion, UFC hall of fame 
 Jon Gernhart (class of 2006) – musician
 Chandler Jones (class of 2008) – NFL player

References

Public high schools in New York (state)
Public high schools in Broome County, New York
1915 establishments in New York (state)